They Could Still Serve is a painting by Ellen Gallagher. It is in the collection of the Museum of Modern Art (MoMA) in New York, New York in the United States. They Could Still Serve represents Gallagher's biggest focused body of work: large scale pieces that explore racial stereotypes of African Americans, specifically those seen in minstrel shows.

Description
Penmanship paper is glued on a canvas with tiny googly eyeballs drawn throughout the piece, primarily on the lines of the penmanship paper.

History
This painting was acquired in 2001 by using funds from Emily and Jerry Spiegel and Anna Marie and Robert F. Shapiro Funds and gift of Agnes Gund. They Could Still Serve has been exhibited in numerous group shows as MoMA. In 2007, it was included in Comic Abstraction: Image-Breaking, Image-Making because of the cartoonish style of the eyeballs. In 2008, the piece was in Multiplex: Directions in Art, 1970 to Now and in 2010-2011's On Line: Drawing Through the Twentieth Century.

Insight about the work
The name, They Could Still Serve, comes from an etching in The Disasters of War series by Francisco de Goya.

References

Further reading
Varnedoe, Kirk. Modern Contemporary. New York: The Museum of Modern Art (2004). 

2001 paintings
21st-century paintings
Paintings by Ellen Gallagher